Dechen is a small, bowl-shaped crater that is located in the northwest part of the Oceanus Procellarum, near the northwest limb of the Moon. The rim of the crater projects slightly above the surrounding lunar mare, and the interior is symmetrical and nearly featureless. It lies to the northeast of the crater Harding, but is otherwise relatively isolated.

Satellite craters
By convention these features are identified on lunar maps by placing the letter on the side of the crater midpoint that is closest to Dechen.

References

 
 
 
 
 
 
 
 
 
 
 
 

Impact craters on the Moon